G.I. Joe: Operation Blackout is a third-person shooter video game based on Hasbro's G.I. Joe toyline, released for Nintendo Switch, PlayStation 4, and Xbox One on October 13, 2020, and for Microsoft Windows on December 15, 2020. The game was developed by IguanaBee and Fair Play Labs and published by GameMill Entertainment in North America and Maximum Games in Europe. It is the first G.I. Joe console game since 2009's G.I. Joe: The Rise of Cobra.

Plot 
During an attack on the USS Flagg, Cobra has managed to take over the world by creating a device called the Blackout Sphere, which knocked out all electrical equipment across the globe and claimed Cobra's victory known as "C-Day". Now the Joes are being hunted down by Cobra and must figure out where their leader Duke is being held, find the other teammates, and take back the world from Cobra's clutches.

Gameplay 
In the base game, players can take on roles of 12 characters from the G.I. Joe Team or the Cobra Command, including Lady Jaye, Snake Eyes, Scarlett, Duke, Roadblock, Storm Shadow, Destro, Baroness, Cobra Commander, and Zartan.

Players can play the story missions with another in local split-screen co-op, or compete in up to four-player player versus player local matches in four multiplayer modes: Capture the Flag, Assault, King of the Hill, and Deathmatch Arena.

Development 
The game was announced on August 12, 2020. A trailer for the game was released the same day. Maximum Games handled publishing duties for the game in the PAL regions. On the day of the announcement, Chilean indie developer IguanaBee revealed that the game was their secret project for 2020. The game is available in a Digital Deluxe edition on all platforms.

On October 19, 2020, six days after the game's release, GameMill Entertainment announced that a Microsoft Windows version was in development.

Reception 

On Metacritic, the PlayStation 4 version of G.I. Joe: Operation Blackout has a score of 51% based on sixteen reviews, the Xbox One version has a score of 56% based on eight reviews, and the Nintendo Switch version has a score of 55% based on four reviews, all indicating "mixed or average" reviews.

References

External links 
 

2020 video games
Nintendo Switch games
PlayStation 4 games
PlayStation 4 Pro enhanced games
Xbox One games
Xbox One X enhanced games
Windows games
GameMill Entertainment games
Video games developed in Chile
Video games developed in Costa Rica
G.I. Joe video games
Terrorism in fiction
Third-person shooters
Multiplayer and single-player video games
Unreal Engine games
Video games based on toys
Split-screen multiplayer games
Maximum Games games